41 Lyncis (abbreviated 41 Lyn), also designated HD 81688 and named Intercrus , is a fifth-magnitude star located in the northern constellation of Ursa Major. An extrasolar planet (designated 41 Lyncis b or HD 81688 b, later named Arkas) is thought to be orbiting the star.

Properties
The spectrum of this star matches a stellar classification of K0 III, with the luminosity class of III suggesting it is a giant star. This star has about double the mass of the Sun, although a re-evaluation of evolutionary tracks published in 2011 gives a lower estimate of  solar masses. It has expanded to 11 times the Sun's radius and is radiating 55 times as much as the Sun from its outer atmosphere at an effective temperature of 4,789 K. This temperature gives it the orange-hued glow of a K-type star.

This star is following an orbit through the Milky Way with an eccentricity of 0.21. For this reason, it is uncertain whether this star is a member of the thin disk population.

Both are background objects, more distant than 41 Lyncis itself, but the two share a common proper motion and are at the same distance as each other.

Nomenclature
41 Lyncis is the Flamsteed designation. Typically, 'Lyncis' is the genitive for a star found in the constellation of Lynx. However, when the constellation boundaries were officially established by the International Astronomical Union (IAU) in 1930, this star was located within Ursa Major. HD 81688 is the entry in the Henry Draper Catalogue. Following its discovery the planet was designated 41 Lyncis b or alternatively HD 81688 b.

In July 2014 the IAU launched NameExoWorlds, a process for giving proper names to certain exoplanets and their host stars. The process involved public nomination and voting for the new names. In December 2015, the IAU announced the winning names were Intercrus for this star and Arkas for its planet.
The winning names were those submitted by the Okayama Astro Club of Japan. Intercrus means "between the legs" in Latin style, referring to the star's position in the constellation Ursa Major. Arkas was the son of Callisto (Ursa Major) in Greek mythology.

The International Astronomical Union Working Group on Star Names (WGSN) has approved the proper name Intercrus for 41 Lyncis.

Planetary system
On 19 February 2008 a planet was announced orbiting the star. It has a minimum mass 2.7 times that of Jupiter and completes an orbit every 184 days.

References

External links
 
 
 
 

Binary stars
046471
Ursa Major (constellation)
081688
Lyncis, 41
K-type giants
Planetary systems with one confirmed planet
3743
Durchmusterung objects